Yasuko Onuki (often known simply as Yako, Yasuko or Yasuko O.) is the singer from Japanese band Melt-Banana, which she founded in 1991. She has a frantic chirping and yelping vocal style which is an important part of Melt-Banana's unique sound. She writes all of Melt-Banana's lyrics, which she sings in English, stating that:

References

External links
 

Living people
Japanese women rock singers
21st-century Japanese singers
21st-century Japanese women singers
Year of birth missing (living people)